C. elongata may refer to:

 Cattleya elongata, an orchid species found in Brazil
 Cyathea elongata, a tree fern species native to Venezuela and Colombia